The Cleveland Memorial Shoreway, often shortened to "the Shoreway", is a limited-access freeway in Cleveland and Bratenahl, Ohio.  It closely follows the shore of Lake Erie and connects the east and west sides of Cleveland via the Main Avenue Bridge over the Cuyahoga River. The entire length of the Shoreway is part of the Lake Erie Circle Tour (LECT) and all but the very eastern end of the Shoreway is part of State Route 2. The Shoreway also carries parts of Interstate 90 and State Route 283 on its eastern side, and parts of U.S. Route 6 and U.S. Route 20 on its western side. The Cleveland neighborhood of Detroit-Shoreway is named after the two roads that form the northern border, the Shoreway and Detroit Avenue.

The Shoreway was originally a constructed in 1936 under the Works Progress Administration (WPA) and was extended in both directions during the 1930s and 1940s, finally completed and widened in 1953. Later in the 1950s, it was connected with additional freeways. It was named in honor of the city's war veterans during World War II. Between 2014 and 2018, the West Shoreway, the portion of the Shoreway from the Cuyahoga River westward, was reconstructed and, in 2016, was named the "Governor Richard F. Celeste Shoreway"; since the reconstruction, this section is also called Edgewater Parkway.

Route description

History
The Shoreway began as a  roadway from East Ninth Street to East 55th Street built in 1930s using Works Progress Administration workers, and it served as access to the Great Lakes Exposition in 1936.  It was the largest WPA project in the country.  Within two years the roadway was extended to the Illuminating Company plant adjacent to Gordon Park, and it was opened for traffic in 1938, although planning delays prevented WPA from laying a second strip of pavement and building grade separations from side streets.  After the completion of the Main Avenue Bridge in 1940, the highway was extended westward to Edgewater Park (since 2013 part of the Cleveland Metroparks Lakefront Reservation).  The East Ninth Street interchange was also completed in 1940.  The highway was extended to Bratenahl at East 140th Street in 1941. The roadway was envisioned as part of a larger system of high speed highways in the city. A West Shore Drive from Edgewater Park to Rocky River was planned, but further construction was interrupted by World War II.  After the War, the previously unnamed highway became the Memorial Shoreway in honor of Cleveland's war veterans.

In 1944, the city and county planning departments and the state highway department developed a master plan for freeways throughout the area.  However, the only additional freeway built was the Willow Freeway.  The Memorial Shoreway permitted crosstown traffic with some stops but was incomplete between East 55th Street and East 72nd Street. In 1953 a further addition connected the sections of Shoreway and widened the original highway to make it an 8-lane, nonstop freeway.   The Interstate Highway Act in 1956 provided the funding to complete much of the freeway system planned in 1944. As part of this effort, the Memorial Shoreway was joined to the new Lakeland Freeway, which by 1963 stretched eastward toward Painesville.

2010s West Shoreway rebuild
The Shoreway west of the Main Avenue Bridge was rebuilt in order to increase ease of access to Lake Erie. The project replaced the median barrier with a landscaped median, and added a vehicular and pedestrian tunnel by Edgewater Park and a bicycle path; original plans to replace grade-separated interchanges with at-grade signalized intersections were dropped due to traffic flow concerns.

Major intersections

See also

References

External links
"Memorial Shoreway" at The Encyclopedia of Cleveland History

Transportation in Cleveland
Cleveland area expressways
Roads in Ohio
Works Progress Administration in Ohio
Interstate 90
U.S. Route 6
U.S. Route 20